Sofia Land (София Ленд) was an amusement park in Sofia, the capital of Bulgaria. Construction of the main building began in July 2001 and the park was opened on 21 September 2002.

Sofia Land featured 4 extreme, 8 children's and 11 all-age rides and attractions, a number of bars, restaurants, coffeehouses, clubs, a bowling alley under the park itself, and a gaming station with PlayStation 2 and other games below. There were also many shops and several cinema halls situated in the park's main building, which resembled a castle.

In September 2006, plans to change the owner and close the park were announced. The park was officially closed down on October 16 of the same year.

References

Parks in Sofia
Amusement parks in Bulgaria
Defunct amusement parks
Buildings and structures in Sofia
Tourist attractions in Sofia
Buildings and structures completed in 2002
2002 establishments in Bulgaria
2006 disestablishments in Bulgaria